Eva-Maria Niit (born 5 February 2002) is an Estonian footballer who plays as a defender for Tammeka and the Estonia women's national team.

Career
She made her debut for the Estonia national team on 23 February 2021 against Slovenia, coming on as a substitute for Pille Raadik.

References

2002 births
Living people
Women's association football defenders
Estonian women's footballers
Estonia women's international footballers
Sportspeople from Tartu
Tartu JK Tammeka (women) players